Lars Unnerstall (born 20 July 1990) is a German professional footballer who plays as a goalkeeper for Dutch club FC Twente.

Club career

Schalke 04

Born in Ibbenbüren, North Rhine-Westphalia, Unnerstall finished his development at FC Schalke 04 after joining at the age of 18. In April 2010, after featuring regularly for the B team, he signed a professional contract until 2012.

For the 2011–12 season, coach Ralf Rangnick announced Unnerstall as second-choice behind Ralf Fährmann. His professional debut took place on 31 July 2011, in an 11–1 away win against FC Teningen in the first round of the DFB-Pokal. In October, he agreed to an extension until June 2013.

On 15 October 2011, after Fährmann's ejection early in the game, Unnerstall made his Bundesliga debut, in an eventual 1–2 home defeat to 1. FC Kaiserslautern. After it was revealed the former had suffered a serious cruciate ligament injury he became the starter, remaining as such even after the signing of veteran Timo Hildebrand and earning praise from manager Huub Stevens.

Unnerstall agreed to a new deal until 2015 before the 2012–13 campaign started. He continued to battle with Hildebrand for starting duties, and was also first choice during the team's run in the UEFA Champions League; he also committed several mistakes in home matches, which led to fan criticism.

During the 2013 off-season, Unnerstall was linked a move away from the club. Nothing came of it, however, and he remained as third-choice behind Fährmann and Hildebrand.

On 24 January 2014, Unnerstall was loaned to Swiss Super League side FC Aarau. His first match took place eight days later, in a 1–1 draw against FC St. Gallen; he was later chosen Player of the Month for this display.

Fortuna Düsseldorf

On 21 May 2014, Unnerstall joined Fortuna Düsseldorf as a replacement for Fabian Giefer, for a reported fee of €250,000. He spent most of his tenure as backup to Michael Rensing, featuring rarely in the 2. Bundesliga and adding two appearances in the 2015–16 edition of the domestic cup.

Increasingly frustrated with his lack of playing time, and occasionally demoted to the reserves, Unnerstall was also afflicted with pneumonia in early 2017.

VVV and PSV
Unnerstall signed a two-year deal with VVV-Venlo in June 2017, for an undisclosed fee. On 18 May of the following year he agreed to a three-year contract at fellow Eredivisie team PSV Eindhoven, being immediately loaned to his previous club.

After a series of poor performances from regular starter Jeroen Zoet in autumn 2019, Unnerstall became first choice for PSV. He finished the season with 14 league appearances.

In the 2020–21 campaign, however, Mark van Bommel's successor Roger Schmidt preferred the newly recruited Yvon Mvogo, and Unnerstall was demoted to backup once again. Due to a tight schedule in the autumn of 2020, he played the full match against Sparta Rotterdam on 29 November, a 1–0 win.

Twente
On 2 March 2021, Unnerstall agreed to join FC Twente also of the Dutch top division as of 1 July.

International career
In September 2010, Unnerstall was called by the German under-20 team, appearing against Switzerland and Poland the following month. On 31 August 2011 he was selected to the under-21s, but did not appear in any games with the latter.

Career statistics

Honours
Schalke 04
DFL-Supercup: 2011

References

External links

1990 births
Living people
People from Ibbenbüren
Sportspeople from Münster (region)
German footballers
Footballers from North Rhine-Westphalia
Association football goalkeepers
Bundesliga players
2. Bundesliga players
FC Schalke 04 II players
FC Schalke 04 players
Fortuna Düsseldorf players
Swiss Super League players
FC Aarau players
Eredivisie players
Eerste Divisie players
VVV-Venlo players
PSV Eindhoven players
Jong PSV players
FC Twente players
Germany youth international footballers
German expatriate footballers
Expatriate footballers in Switzerland
Expatriate footballers in the Netherlands
German expatriate sportspeople in Switzerland
German expatriate sportspeople in the Netherlands